Château de Bridoire is a château in Ribagnac, Dordogne, Nouvelle-Aquitaine, France.

Châteaux in Dordogne
Monuments historiques of Dordogne